Cristobal Alejandro González Urzua (Rancagua, Chile, February 15, 1982) is a Chilean footballer. Play as the wheel and defense in Ñublense of Primera División de Chile using the jersey No. 27.

See also
Football in Chile
List of football clubs in Chile

References

1982 births
Living people
Chilean footballers
Deportes Colchagua footballers
Deportes Concepción (Chile) footballers
O'Higgins F.C. footballers
Ñublense footballers
Cobresal footballers
Puerto Montt footballers
Chilean Primera División players
Primera B de Chile players
Association football defenders
People from Rancagua